Miss Universe Guyana is a national beauty pageant in Guyana.

History

Miss Guyana
Began in 1947 to 1966 Guyana had called as Miss British Guiana at the final stage. Since 1988 Guyana has called as Miss Guyana. The very first Miss Universe British Guiana in that epoch was Rosalind Iva Joan Fung from Georgetown.

Miss Universe Guyana
Miss Universe Guyana is a national beauty pageant in Guyana. Between 2002 and 2015 Odinga Lumumba became President of Miss Guyana pageant. In that year she organizes the local pageant named Miss Guyana Universe. It is the only official national pageant for the Miss Universe pageant.

In March 2016, Miss Universe Guyana was owned by Jyoti Hardat from the Moonlight Productions. In 2018, Guyana was barred from the Miss Universe pageant due to receiving hate mail and harassment related to claims that Hardat ran rigged competitions in New York favoring Rafieya Husain, who was a previous year's contestant. According to Hardat, Husain was never a previous Miss Universe contestant, but rather a Miss Universe Guyana contestant. The organization, Hardat, as well as Husain all received email death-threats. Hardat, who paid for the rights to the franchise on her own, left the organization in 2017.

Seasons
2012: On September 12, 2012 for the first time in history, Leila Lopes, Miss Universe 2011 of Angola attended the final of Miss Guyana Universe 2012 while Ruqayyah Boyer declared as the new titleholder of Guyana.
2013: On October 8, 2013 Katherina Roshana crowned Miss Guyana Universe 2013. For the first time the reigning titleholder of Miss Guyana was Miss Indian Guyana 2013.

Titleholders

Miss Universe Guyana has started to send a Winner to Miss Universe from 1956. Since 2002 the pageant covered to be Miss Universe Guyana competition which officially selected a national winning title to Miss Universe. On occasion, when the winner does not qualify (due to age) for either contest, a runner-up is sent.

References

External links
missuniverseguyana.org

Beauty pageants in Guyana
Guyana
Recurring events established in 1956
Guyanese awards
Annual events in Guyana